Gajapati, 'Ruler of the elephants' in Sanskrit, may refer to:

 Gajapati (title), a king with an army of elephants; title for a powerful ruler
 Gajapati Empire, a medieval Hindu dynasty in India ruled by the Suryavamsa dynasty
 Gajapati district, a district in Odisha, India